The Lamesa Lobos (a.k.a. Lamesa Dodgers and Lamesa Indians)  were a minor league baseball team based in Lamesa, Texas. They played in the West Texas–New Mexico League from 1939 to 1942, shut down for World War II, and then resumed from 1946–1952. They moved to the Longhorn League in 1953 and moved on June 3 to become the Winters-Ballinger Eagles (representing both Winters, Texas and Ballinger, Texas). In 1957 the Midland Indians of the Southwestern League moved to town and became the Lamesa Indians for the rest of the season.

External links
Baseball Reference

Defunct minor league baseball teams
Defunct baseball teams in Texas
Brooklyn Dodgers minor league affiliates
Washington Senators minor league affiliates
Baseball teams established in 1939
Baseball teams disestablished in 1957
1939 establishments in Texas
1957 disestablishments in Texas
Dawson County, Texas
Longhorn League teams